Lu Zhenhong (born April 15, 1991) is a Chinese baseball outfielder who plays with the Jiangsu Hopestars in the China Baseball League. 

Lu represented China at the 2012 Asia Series, 2012 Asian Baseball Championship, 2013 World Baseball Classic, 2017 World Baseball Classic and 2018 Asian Games.

References

1991 births
Living people
Asian Games competitors for China
Baseball outfielders
Baseball players at the 2018 Asian Games
Chinese expatriate baseball players in the United States
Jiangsu Hopestars players
Jiangsu Pegasus players
Texas AirHogs players
2013 World Baseball Classic players
2017 World Baseball Classic players